Judge Shea may refer to:

Edward F. Shea (born 1942), judge of the United States District Court for the Eastern District of Washington
Michael P. Shea (born 1967), judge of the United States District Court for the District of Connecticut.

See also
Justice Shea (disambiguation)